A sleeve is the part of a garment that covers the arm, or through which the arm passes or slips.

Sleeve may also refer to:

 Arm coverings:
 A basketball sleeve, an accessory worn by basketball players
 A sleeve tattoo,  a tattoo arrangement that covers most or all of a person's arm
 Cylindrical mechanical protective liners:
 A sleeve (construction), used by electricians and plumbers to create an opening in cast concrete to permit the passage of a wires or pipes
 A cylinder sleeve lining the bore of a piston engine
 A sleeve valve, a type of valve mechanism for piston engines
 A sleeve bearing to hold a rotating shaft
 Generally, any tube into which another tube is inserted; in the case of small tubes it is called a thimble
 Other protective covers:
 A record sleeve, the outer covering of a vinyl record
 A card sleeve used to protect trading cards from damage during play
 A beer sleeve or koozie
 A sleeve gastrectomy, a surgical weight-loss procedure